Villu Paatu (English: Bow Song, Tamil: வில்லுப்பாட்டு), also known as Villadichampaatu, is an ancient form of musical story-telling method performed in Southern India , where narration is interspersed with music, an art of southern states of Tamil Nadu and Kerala, as well as North-East Sri Lanka. This art form is popular among Nadar and Ezhava castes of erstwhile Travancore kingdom. Simple tunes and verses make the story easy to follow. The villu (bow), the age-old weapon of warriors - paradoxically lends itself to be used as a primary musical instrument (a musical bow) for the Villu Paatu artists.

Overview

In Tamil villages, performers narrate stories ranging from mythological to social. The main storyteller narrates the story striking the bow. The bow rests on a mud pot kept facing downwards. A co-performer beats the pot while singing. There is usually another co-singer who acts as active listener to the narration, uttering appropriate oral responses.  The local government sometimes utilises this as a vehicle for social messages and propaganda.  Villu pattu troupes usually perform for festivals associated with deities such as Sudalai Madan, Mutharamman, Pechiamman, Isakkiamman, etc.  The Villu pattu tradition is associated with the culture of southern Tamil Nadu, southern Kerala and North-East Sri Lanka.

There are also Udukki (உடுக்கை), Kudam (குடம்), Thala, Kattai(கட்டை), which are used as supplementary instruments in performances. Udukki is a small drum with a slender middle portion which is held in the left hand and played by the fingers of the right hand. Occasionally, the Villu Pattu team divides itself into two groups, each trying to prove opposite points-of-view of a subject. This is called Lavani Pattu.  The songs used by the Villu Pattu artists are mostly traditional folk-songs. They are played during occasions of temple festivals in villages. The songs sung mostly in Villu Paatu praise a god or tell a story. These days the number of artists performing Villu Paatu is tremendously reduced as the income earned from it is never enough for running one's life.

Books

Source

References

External links

 http://villuppaattu-tamil.blogspot.com/
 Video: Performed in a Temple in Kallidaikurichi

Indian styles of music
Indian musical instruments
Performing arts in India
Arts of Kerala